HMS K15 was a K class submarine built by Scotts, Greenock. She was laid down on 19 April 1916 and was commissioned on 30 April 1918.

K15 sank due to an accident, when moored alongside the light cruiser  at Portsmouth Harbour on 25 June 1921. She was then salved in July 1921. K15 was sold in August 1924 in Upnor.

Design
K15 displaced  when at the surface and  while submerged. The submarine was powered by two oil-fired Yarrow Shipbuilders boilers each supplying one geared Brown-Curtis or Parsons steam turbine; this developed 10,500 shaft horsepower (7,800 kW) to drive two  screws. Submerged power came from four electric motors each producing . It was also had an  diesel engine to be used when steam was being raised, or instead of raising steam.

K15 was armed with ten  torpedo tubes, two  deck guns, and a  anti-aircraft gun. The torpedo tubes were mounted in the bows, the midship section firing to the beam, and two were on a rotating mounting on the deck. Its complement was fifty-nine crew members.

References

Bibliography
 

 

British K-class submarines
Ships built on the River Clyde
1917 ships
Maritime incidents in 1921
Royal Navy ship names